Erode East or 'Erode (East)' is a state assembly constituency in Erode district in the state of Tamil Nadu, India. Its State Assembly Constituency number is 98. It consists of a portion of Erode taluk which includes Erode City. It is included in Erode Parliamentary Constituency. It is one of the 234 State Legislative Assembly Constituencies in Tamil Nadu, in India.

This constituency was newly formed, in the year of 2008, by dividing the integrated Erode Assembly Constituency.

Boundaries and parts
Erode East covers the central part of Erode City Corporation to the river Kaveri on the east and Modakurichi Constituency limit on the south; a part of the city is also covered by that constituency.

The eastern part of the city, to the eastern banks of the river Kaveri is included in Kumarapalayam Constituency.

Demographics
Gender demographic of Erode East as of 11.02.2023, taken during the by-election in 2023.

Members of Legislative Assembly
Elected members from this constituency are as follows:

Election results

2023

2021

2016

2011

References 

 

Assembly constituencies of Tamil Nadu
Erode